The Angolan free-tailed bat (Mops condylurus) is a species of bat in the family Molossidae. It is found in Angola, Benin, Botswana, Burkina Faso, Burundi, Cameroon, the Republic of the Congo, the Democratic Republic of the Congo, Ivory Coast,  Eswatini, Ethiopia, Gambia, Ghana, Guinea, Kenya, Malawi, Mali, Mozambique, Namibia, Niger, Nigeria, Rwanda, Senegal, Sierra Leone, Somalia, South Africa, South Sudan, Sudan, Tanzania, Togo, Uganda, Zambia, and Zimbabwe. Its natural habitats are dry and moist savanna, although it is sometimes found at the edges of woodlands.

Taxonomy and etymology

Scottish zoologist Andrew Smith in 1833 described it as a new species. He placed it in the now-defunct genus Nyctinomus, with a binomial of Nyctinomus condylurus. Its species name "condylurus" was likely derived from the Latin "condylus". In anatomy, condyle refers to a round prominence at the end of the bone. Smith referred to the Angolan free-tailed bat as "knob-tailed".

Description

It has short, silky fur. Its fur is brown, ears are black, and wings are blackish-brown. Its lips are wrinkled. Half of the tail extends beyond the edge of the uropatagium.

Biology and ecology

It is nocturnal and roosts in sheltered places during the day, such as human structures, tree hollows, and rock crevices.

Conservation

As of 2017, it was evaluated as a least-concern species by the International Union for Conservation of Nature.

References

Mops (bat)
Taxonomy articles created by Polbot
Bats of Africa
Mammals described in 1833
Taxa named by Andrew Smith (zoologist)